Pio Schiavi (born 27 August 1998) is an Italian football player.

Club career

Napoli
He represented Napoli U-19 squad in the 2016–17 UEFA Youth League and 2017–18 UEFA Youth League.

Loan to Juve Stabia
On 22 July 2018, he joined Serie C club Juve Stabia on loan. He previously played for the junior teams of Juve. He made his Serie C debut for Juve Stabia on 20 November 2018 in a game against Viterbese Castrense as an 83rd-minute substitute for Roberto Vitiello.

Imolese
On 26 August 2019, he signed with Imolese.

Personal life
His cousin Raffaele Schiavi is also a footballer.

References

External links
 

1998 births
People from Cava de' Tirreni
Footballers from Campania
Living people
Italian footballers
Association football defenders
S.S. Juve Stabia players
Imolese Calcio 1919 players
Serie C players
Sportspeople from the Province of Salerno